Ijimaia is a genus of jellynose fishes, one of four in the order Ateleopodiformes.

Species
The currently recognized species in this genus are:
 Ijimaia antillarum Howell-Rivero, 1935
 Ijimaia dofleini Sauter, 1905
 Ijimaia fowleri Howell-Rivero, 1935
 Ijimaia loppei Roule, 1922 (Loppe's tadpole fish)
 Ijimaia plicatellus (C. H. Gilbert, 1905) (deepwater ateleopodid)

References

Ateleopodiformes